The Roman Catholic Diocese of Andong is a diocese of the Latin Church of the Catholic Church located in Andong, South Korea. The diocese is suffragan to the Archdiocese of Daegu.

History
On 29 May 1969 Pope Paul VI established the Diocese of Andong from territory taken from the Archdiocese of Daegu and the Diocese of Wonju.

Ordinaries
René Marie Albert Dupont (1969–1990)
Ignatius Pak Sok-hi (1990–2000)
John Chrisostom Kwon Hyeok-ju (2001–present)

References

Christian organizations established in 1969
Andong
Andong
Andong
Roman Catholic Ecclesiastical Province of Daegu